Dave Rearick (born August 5, 1932) is an American rock climber and mathematician. A pioneer of Yosemite's golden age of climbing, Rearick – frequently climbing with Bob Kamps – was instrumental in shifting the focus from aid climbing to free climbing in the 1950s.

Rearick and Royal Robbins climbed the Vampire at Tahquitz Rock in California in 1959; though some aid was used (not eliminated until 1973), the route required 5.10 climbing, exceptionally difficult for the times. A year later the team of Robbins and Rearick established Yosemite's first 5.10 climb: the East Chimney of Rixon's Pinnacle.

In August 1960, Kamps and Rearick made the first ascent of the Diamond, the massive headwall on the east face of  Longs Peak, in Colorado. Their ascent was reported in newspapers across America.

Rearick received a PhD in mathematics from Caltech, defending his thesis during the spring of 1960. He became a mathematics professor at the University of Colorado at Boulder, retiring in the 1990s.

See also
List of climbers

References
 Ament, Pat (2002). "Wizards of Rock: A History of Free Climbing in America", Wilderness Press

External links
  Brief Profile

American rock climbers
1934 births
Living people